Sandip Burman is a tabla player from Durgapur, West Bengal, India.

After his initial training with Shri Sudhir Roy, he began a long discipleship with Pandit Shymal Bose. Sandip's performances are marked with spontaneous innovation and tonal purity even when he is delivering complex rhythmic patterns at high speed. His initial trip to the USA was sponsored by the founder of Transcendental Meditation and Beatles guru Maharishi Mahesh Yogi.

Sandip Burman either performs for shows across the world or attends school-sponsored performances. In these lessons he is known to take the same care of warming up and playing as if it were a real performance. He tunes his 20 string sitar and tabla for around an hour prior to his lesson. Once all the students surround him he begins to play - a wide display of improvisation that seems to come from his soul. After he performs on sitar he leaves a portion of the clinic open for questions to get to know him and learn from him. Then he moves to his expertise, the tabla. His hands fly through the drums at lightning speed and precision filling the area with a melody rather than a beat. 
Sandip has played with Ravi Shankar and countless jazz greats, including Jack DeJohnette, Al Di Meola, Randy Brecker, Howard Levy, Paul McCandless, Andy Narell, Victor Wooten, Bela Fleck and many others.

Sandip worked with Danny Elfman and contributed to the soundtrack of Tim Burton's film, Mars Attacks!, and an IBM commercial. Sandip has recorded with Dr. L. Subramaniam and is showcased on the album Global Fusion from Warner Brothers. 
In 2001, Sandip lead an all-star tour titled "East Meets Jazz" with Victor Bailey (Weather Report), Randy Brecker (Brecker Brothers), Steve Smith (Journey), Howard Levy (Flecktones), Jerry Goodman (Mahavishnu Orchestra), and Paul Bollenback.  Dave Pietro also joined the group for one show.  The tour ended suddenly and early due to the 9/11 attack but closed at The Lyric with a standing room only show the night of 9/11 that is still talked about years later. The band's Producer & Manager (Chuck Hawks) was noted as saying despite the stresses of the day, it turned out to be one of the band's  best performances of the entire tour.

Currently, Sandip tours 170 days out of the year, with such dates as solo performances at the Kennedy Center (Washington D.C.), Street Scene (San Diego), First Night Providence (Rhode Island), House of Blues Chicago, Nelson Atkins Museum (Kansas City), Wolftrap (Washington, D.C.), Ravinia Festival (Chicago), Skirball Cultural Center (Los Angeles), Telluride Bluegrass Festival (Colorado), and the Stern Grove Festival (San Francisco). Before concerts, Sandip often takes the time to conduct music clinics at the local high schools and universities.

He has been a visiting faculty member at the Rotterdam Conservatory in the Netherlands and has toured and taught in the United States, Europe, Australia, New Zealand, Mexico, Singapore, North Africa, Israel, and Canada.

References   

 
Sandip Burman Official Site

American people of Bengali descent
American male musicians of Indian descent
American musicians of Indian descent
American Hindus
Living people
Indian emigrants to the United States
Indian drummers
People from Durgapur, West Bengal
1969 births